Rosa Taddei (August 30, 1799 – March 3, 1869) was an Italian actress and poet. She was also known by her married name Rosa Mozzidolfi.

Although she considered herself a Neapolitan, Taddei may have been born in Trento or Corato. She was the daughter of Francesco Taddei; her father, mother and brother Luigi were all actors. She was considered one of the most beautiful and talented tragic actors of her day. Taddei was best known as an "improvisatrice" or improvisational poet. She was a distinguished member of the Accademia degli Arcadi in Rome, where she was known as Licori Partenopea. In 1832, she married Vincenzo Mozzidolfi.

She died in Rome in 1869.

References 

1799 births
1869 deaths
19th-century Italian actresses
Italian stage actresses
Italian poets
Italian women poets
19th-century Italian women writers